Golden Child (abbreviated as GNCD or GolCha) is a South Korean boy band formed by Woollim Entertainment in 2017.The group is composed of ten members: Daeyeol, Y, Jangjun, Tag, Seungmin, Jaehyun, Jibeom, Donghyun, Joochan and Bomin. Originally an eleven-piece ensemble, Jaeseok departed from the group due to health issues in early 2018.
The group debuted on August 28, 2017 with their EP Gol-Cha!.

History

2017: W Project, 2017 Woollim Pick and debut with Gol-cha!
In January 2017, Woollim Entertainment launched pre-debut project for trainees, W Project. Five members of Golden Child (Joochan, Jangjun, Tag, Daeyeol, Donghyun) and former member Jaeseok were introduced under the pre-debut project.
 
On May 15, Woollim Entertainment launched new boy group Golden Child, their first boy group in seven years since Infinite. On May 17, the eleven member names of the group's line-up were revealed. On May 22, Woollim Entertainment dropped "class photos" concept for Golden Child and confirmed that they would have their pre-debut reality show 2017 Woollim Pick. On August 9, it was announced that Golden Child would make a cameo appearance on 20th Century Boy and Girl.

Golden Child officially debuted on August 28 with their first EP Gol-cha!, with a total of six tracks including the title track "DamDaDi". Their debut showcase was held at the Blue Square iMarket Hall on the same day as the album's release. On September 1, Golden Child made their official debut stage on the music program Music Bank, performing title track "DamDaDi" and "I Love You So". On September 17, the EP has reached No. 1 on Japan’s largest music site Tower Records’ daily chart. On October 16, they released a soundtrack Love Letter on 20th Century Boy and Girl.

2018: Reorganization as ten members, Miracle, Goldenness, and Wish
On January 6, 2018, it was announced that Jaeseok had left the group due to health issues. The remaining ten members continued as a group and released their second EP, Miracle, on January 29. The EP contains six tracks including the title track "It's U". Their comeback showcase was held at the Blue Square iMarket Hall on the same day as the album's release. They continue the promotions with the release of the music video for "Lady" from their second EP. On April 13, they officially finished their three month promotions.

On May 22, Golden Child held their first fanmeeting Golden Day to celebrate their first debut anniversary in Seoul, South Korea. They also held Japanese fanmeeting in Nagoya and Tokyo on May 24 and May 25 respectively. On June 24, Golden Child performed at KCON NY 2018. On 11 August, Golden Child performed as the line-up for KCON LA 2018. Continuously, they confirmed their line-up for the first ever KCON Thailand on 29 September 2018.

On May 4, Golden Child announced their official fanclub name 'Goldenness', followed by the release of their first single album Goldenness on July 4, which contains three tracks including the lead single "Let Me".

At the Fanclub Inauguration Ceremony named 'Golden Child Cheerful Geumdong Time' on 14 October, they surprised their fans by announcing their comeback. On October 24, Golden Child held a comeback showcase and released their 3rd EP WISH. This EP had 7 tracks including the title track "Genie" with more mature image.

2019–2020: Re-boot, Without You, Road to Kingdom, Take a Leap, and Pump It Up
On May 2, 2019, Golden Child released their first digital single "Spring Again" as a gift for fans during their hiatus. Golden Child's first web sitcom Crazy Petty Housemate began airing starting October 16 on Lululala Story Lab media platforms. The eight-episode web sitcom aired every Wednesday and Saturday.

On November 18, Golden Child released their first studio album Re-boot. The album contains twelve tracks including the title track "Wannabe". Golden Child won their first-ever music program win on December 26, through M Countdown.

Golden Child successfully held their first solo concert, Future and Past on January 18 and 19, 2020. A repackaged version of their first studio album titled Without You was released on January 29, 2020, consisting of the title track of the same name.

On March 20, it was announced that the group will join Mnet's reality television competition Road to Kingdom. They were the first group eliminated in the fifth episode. On May 31, Golden Child and other Woollim Entertainment artists released a collaboration single Relay under the name With Woollim.

On June 23, Golden Child released their fourth EP, Take a Leap, containing seven tracks including the title track "One (Lucid Dream)". On August 18, it was announced that Golden Child will hold an online concert, NOW, on September 13.

On September 13, it was announced that Golden Child will make a comeback on October 7 with their second single album Pump It Up containing three tracks including the title track of the same name.

On December 17, Jaehyun tested positive for COVID-19.  On December 31, it was announced that Jaehyun had tested negative for COVID-19 and Golden Child will resume activities.

2021: Yes., Game Changer and Ddara
On January 2, it was announced that Golden Child would return with their fifth EP, Yes. and its lead single "Burn It" on January 25. "Burn It" charted on iTunes' Top Albums Chart, reaching a spot in the top 10 in 11 regions.

On June 18, it was announced that Golden Child will hold an online/offline concert, Summer Breeze, on July 17 and 18. However, it was postposed due to rising COVID-19 cases in Korea.

On June 26, Golden Child participated and performed a splendid stage at 2021 Dream Concert. The 2021 Dream Concert was held at Sangam World Cup Stadium in Seongsan-dong, Mapo-gu, Seoul.

On August 2, Golden Child released their second studio album, Game Changer and its lead single "Ra Pam Pam". The mv reached 20M views in Youtube within 3 days after its release.

On August 9, Hanteo Chart announced that the album Game Changer sold more than 126,000 copies in the first week and became the album with highest 1st week sales under Woollim Ent surpassing 'Yes' by Golden Child. Hanteo Chart issued an official certificate which proves the Initial Chodong sales amount over 100,000 copies. Thus Golden Child proved themselves as one of the main group representing K-pop by showing 1.8 times growth compared to the previous album YES 's Initial Chodong record (71,485 copies).

The title track 'Ra Pam Pam' debuted at #2 on Billboard World Digital Song Sales Chart and #37 on Billboard Digital Song Sales Chart. Golden Child is the third K-pop Boy Group to be named on the Chart and holding the title for the highest debut record. 'Ra Pam Pam' topped the Mongolian iTunes top song after its release at 6 p.m. on August 2. In addition, the 'Game Changer' ranked First in Turkey on the iTunes top K-pop album chart, Second in Israel, Thailand, Australia, Singapore, United States, Spain, Indonesia and Malaysia, Third in Hong Kong and Canada, and thus ranked within TOP5 in 11 countries and regions.

On October 5, Golden Child released the repackaged version of their second studio album titled Ddara, and its lead single of the same name.

2022: Japanese debut, increased international exposure and Aura
On January 16, Golden Child performed in Expo 2020 Dubai's Korea National Day K-pop concert.

On January 26, Golden Child made their Japanese debut with the single "A Woo!!". "A Woo!!" debuted at number one on the Oricon Weekly Singles Chart, Billboard Japans Singles Sales Chart (January 24–26), and Tower Records' National Sales Singles Chart.

Golden Child held an online/offline concert, Play, on February 5 and 6 at KBS Arena. During the concert, Daeyeol announced that he would be enlisting for his mandatory military service soon, although without a set date.

On March 21, the agency announced that Lee Dae-yeol will enlist in the military on March 29, 2022, enlisting in the 3rd Army Brigade.

On May 11, Golden Child released their second Japanese single "Rata-Tat-Tat". In support of their first Japanese comeback, Golden Child held a two-day showcase in Tokyo on April 30 and May 1, 2022, at the Maihama Amphitheater. "Rata-Tat-Tat" debuted at number three on the Oricon Daily Singles Chart.

On May 23, Tag was admitted to a general hospital on May 18 after being diagnosed with a liver condition and underwent a thorough examination. Therefore, Golden Child's future schedules will operate as an 8 member system. On June 27, Tag's health conditions improved and was confirmed to be returning to activities, however, he will be excluded in Golden Child's current schedules overseas.

On June 24, Golden Child began their first US concert tour with stops in 10 cities.  

On July 10, Golden Child performed in New York City's Central Park SummerStage Concert Program as part of the line-up for the Korea Cultural Center of NY's Korea Gayoje.

On July 30, Golden Child performed in London as part of the lineup at the MIK Festival, the first outdoor K-pop music festival in Europe.  Woollim Entertainment also announced that Golden Child will join Weverse to communicate with fans on the platform.

On August 8, Golden Child released their sixth EP, Aura with its title track "Replay".

Golden Child will be part of the line-up for "MBC Idol Radio Live in Tokyo" on October 20, and on October 21, Golden Child will perform in Manila as part of the line-up for the "I-Pop U 22" concert.

2023: Y military service 
On February 27, 2023, Woollim Entertainment announced that Y will enlist in the military on March 20, and is also planning to release a single in mid-March, before military service.

Other ventures

Ambassadorship
On December 6, 2017, Golden Child was officially appointed as the new ambassadors for "Korea Scout Association" for 2018.

Philanthropy
On November 30, 2018, Golden Child performed at Charity Concert for Palu, Sigi and Donggala in Indonesia. All profits from the concert were donated to the victims of earthquake and tsunami in Palu, Sigi and Donggala.

Members

 Lee Dae-yeol (이대열) –  leader, lead vocalist, lead dancer
 Y (와이) –  main vocalist
 Lee Jang-jun (이장준) –  main rapper
 Tag (태그) –  main rapper
 Bae Seung-min (배승민) –  lead vocalist
 Bong Jae-hyun (봉재현) –  sub vocalist
 Kim Ji-beom (김지범) –  lead vocalist
 Kim Dong-hyun (김동현) –  sub vocalist, main dancer
 Hong Joo-chan (홍주찬) –  main vocalist
 Choi Bo-min (최보민) –  sub vocalist, dancer

Former

 Park Jae-seok (박재석) –  sub vocalist, dancer

Discography

Studio albums

Reissues

Extended plays

Single albums

Singles

Other releases

Videography

Music videos

Filmography

Film

Television series

Reality series

Web series

Concerts

Golden Child 1st Concert - Future and Past

Golden Child Ontact Concert - NOW

2021 Golden Child Concert - Summer Breeze (Cancelled)

2022 Golden Child Concert - Play

2022 Golden Child US Concert Tour - Play

Awards and nominations

Notes

References

Woollim Entertainment artists
K-pop music groups
Musical groups established in 2017
South Korean boy bands
South Korean dance music groups
South Korean pop music groups
Musical groups from Seoul
2017 establishments in South Korea